CCUC is a four-letter abbreviation which may refer to:

Conference on Computers in Undergraduate Curriculum
 Council of Church Universities and Colleges